RFA Fort Duquesne (A229) was an air stores ship of the Royal Fleet Auxiliary a Fort type ship.

The ship was launched on 28 September 1944 and named SS Queensborough Park. Built as merchant steamship constructed for Canada's Merchant Navy in 1944 during the Second World War as part of Canada's Park ship program.  Managed by the Park Steamship Company in Montreal.

World war 2
On 25 November 1944 she was commissioned and renamed Fort Duquesne for the Ministry of War Transport. She was completed as a refrigerated Victualling Stores Issuing Ship (VSIS) and placed under management of George Nisbet & Company of Glasgow UK.

On 3 January 1945 she sailed in escorted convoy HX 330 from New York to Tyne. On 25 February 1945 she sailed in escorted convoy ON 287 from the Clyde to Panama. On 22 November 1946 sailed Sydney to Hong Kong with a cargo of 160 tons of frozen meat. On 19 March 1947 she passed Gibraltar sailing on to Trincomalee, Ceylon and to Plymouth. On 24 March 1947 arrived at Plymouth Sound from Hong Kong and Colombo.

Post war
The ship was transferred to the RFA-Royal Fleet Auxiliary Navy on 16 September 1947. On 31 January 1951 and 4 February 1951 she did sea trials off Isle of Portland and Plymouth UK using Dragon Fly helicopters from RNAS Gosport and RNAS Culdrose. The trials were conducted with 705 Naval Air Squadron in the English Channel using two Dragonfly HR1 helicopters. The helicopters used were Dragonfly VX598 and Dragonfly VZ963.

In 1955 she starred in the film  The Battle of the River Plate, playing the German freighter Tacoma, which took the crew off the cruiser Admiral Graf Spee before she was scuttled off Montevideo.

Fort Duquesne was decommissioned in April 1967 and put in reserve at Chatham. She arrived at the Scheldt for demolition at Tamise on 29 June 1967. During World War II, 28 were lost to enemy action, and four were lost due to accidents. Many of the surviving 166 ships passed to the United States Maritime Commission.

See also
RFA Fort Charlotte (A236)
RFA Fort Langley (A230)
RFA Fort Rosalie (A186)
Fort Cataraqui (ship)

References

Ships of the Royal Fleet Auxiliary
1944 ships